Mimudea flavinotata is a moth in the family of Crambidae. It was discovered by William Warren in 1892. It was found in Brazil (Rio de Janeiro).

References

Moths described in 1892
Spilomelinae